The genus Cayratia consists of species of vine plants, typical of the tribe Cayratieae. Some of them are useful, and they are found in tropical and subtropical areas of Asia, Africa, Australia, and islands of the Pacific Ocean.

Within the Vitaceae, Cayratia is most closely related to Tetrastigma and Cyphostemma.  As previously configured, the genus Cayratia was found not be monophyletic (for example, C. japonica was moved to Causonis being distinct from Cayratia pedata, the type species).

Species
Plants of the World Online currently includes:

 Cayratia acris (F.Muell.) Domin
 Cayratia acuminata (A.Gray) A.C.Sm.
 Cayratia albifolia C.L.Li
 Cayratia anemonifolia (Zipp. ex Miq.) Suess.
 Cayratia apoensis (Elmer) Quisumb.
 Cayratia calcicola Domin
 Cayratia cambodiana Gagnep.
 Cayratia cardiophylla Jackes
 Cayratia cardiospermoides (Planch. ex Franch.) Gagnep.
 Cayratia ceratophora Gagnep.
 Cayratia cheniana L.M.Lu & J.Wen
 Cayratia ciliifera (Merr.) Chun
 Cayratia coi J.Wen & Boggan
 Cayratia cordifolia C.Y.Wu ex C.L.Li
 Cayratia cumingiana (Turcz.) Galet
 Cayratia cuneata Domin
 Cayratia daliensis C.L.Li
 Cayratia debilis (Baker) Suess.
 Cayratia delicatula (Willems) Desc.
 Cayratia emarginata Trias-Blasi & J.Parn.
 Cayratia fugongensis C.L.Li
 Cayratia gracilis (Guill. & Perr.) Suess.
 Cayratia hayatae Gagnep.
 Cayratia ibuensis (Hook.f.) Suess.
 Cayratia imerinensis (Baker) Desc.
 Cayratia irosinensis (Elmer) Galet
 Cayratia lanceolata (C.L.Li) J.Wen & Z.D.Chen
 Cayratia lineata (Warb.) Merr. & L.M.Perry
 Cayratia longiflora Desc.
 Cayratia medoensis C.L.Li
 Cayratia megacarpa (Lauterb.) Merr. & L.M.Perry
 Cayratia melananthera Gagnep.
 Cayratia menglaensis C.L.Li
 Cayratia mollissima (Wall.) Gagnep.
 Cayratia nervosa (Planch.) Suess.
 Cayratia novemfolia (Wall. ex M.A.Lawson) Burkill ex Suess.
 Cayratia palauana (Hosok.) Suess.
 Cayratia palmata Gagnep.
 Cayratia pedata (Lam.) Gagnep.type species
 Cayratia pellita Gagnep.
 Cayratia polydactyla (Miq.) Galet
 Cayratia reticulata (M.A.Lawson) Mabb.
 Cayratia ridleyi Suess.
 Cayratia roxburghii (Planch.) Gagnep.
 Cayratia saponaria (Seem. ex Benth.) Domin
 Cayratia schumanniana (Gilg) Suess.
 Cayratia seemanniana A.C.Sm.
 Cayratia setulosa (Diels & Gilg) Suess.
 Cayratia sonneratii Gagnep.
 Cayratia thalictrifolia (Planch.) Suess.
 Cayratia timorensis (DC.) C.L.Li
 Cayratia triternata (Baker) Desc.

References

External links

 
Vitaceae genera